Clear Creek is an unincorporated community in Siskiyou County, California, United States.

References

Unincorporated communities in California
Unincorporated communities in Siskiyou County, California